Nassau Coliseum, New York 1980 is a live album by Bruce Springsteen and the E Street Band, released in March 2015, and was the fourth official release through the Bruce Springsteen Archives. The show was originally recorded live at the Nassau Coliseum in Uniondale, New York, on December 31, 1980.

On July 5, 2019, a remixed and upgraded version of the recording was released, concurrent with the release of the concert at the same venue two nights prior.

Background
The concert, performed on New Year's Eve 1980 and New Year's Day 1981, is known for clocking in at almost four hours of music with 38 songs. The recording marks the first live release from the River Tour. Several selections from the show were released on various compilations over the years; "4th of July, Asbury Park (Sandy)"
previously appeared on the 1986 Live/1975–85 box set, and the recording of "Merry Christmas Baby" was included on the 1987 compilation album A Very Special Christmas. Additionally, the non-album track "Rendezvous" was later released on the outtake set Tracks in 1998.

Track listing
All tracks by Bruce Springsteen, except where noted.

Set one
"Night" – 3:25
"Prove It All Night" – 5:57
"Spirit in the Night" – 7:42
"Darkness on the Edge of Town"   – 4:48
"Independence Day" – 5:30
"Who'll Stop the Rain – 5:56 
Originally recorded by Creedence Clearwater Revival
"This Land is Your Land" – 3:19 
Originally recorded by Woody Guthrie
"The Promised Land" – 5:55
"Out in the Street" – 5:25
"Racing in the Street" – 8:22
"The River" – 6:56
"Badlands" – 5:41
"Thunder Road" – 7:05

Set two
"Cadillac Ranch" – 5:02
"Sherry Darling" – 5:15
"Hungry Heart" – 4:45
"Merry Christmas, Baby – 4:50 
Originally recorded by Johnny Moore's Three Blazers
"Fire" – 4:32
"Candy's Room" – 3:23
"Because the Night" – 8:38
"4th of July, Asbury Park (Sandy)" – 6:47
"Rendezvous" – 3:27
"Fade Away" – 9:23
"The Price You Pay" – 6:37
"Wreck on the Highway" – 5:36
"Two Hearts" – 2:50
"Ramrod" – 4:39
"You Can Look (But You Better Not Touch)" – 4:39
"Held Up Without a Gun" – 1:42
"In the Midnight Hour" – 2:55
Originally recorded by Wilson Pickett 
"Auld Lang Syne – 2:03 
Poem originally written by Robert Burns 
"Rosalita (Come Out Tonight)" – 16:19

Encore
"Santa Claus Is Coming to Town – 5:23 
Originally recorded by Harry Reser Orchestra
"Jungleland" – 12:23
"Born to Run" – 4:38
"Detroit Medley" – 13:07
"Devil With a Blue Dress On"  Originally recorded by Mitch Ryder and the Detroit Wheels
"See See Rider"  Originally recorded by Ma Rainey 
"Good Golly Miss Molly"  Originally recorded by Little Richard 
"Jenny Take a Ride"  Originally recorded by Mitch Ryder and the Detroit Wheels
"Twist and Shout" – 8:00 Phil Medley and Bert Berns
Originally recorded by the Isley Brothers
"Raise Your Hand – 4:44 
Originally recorded by Eddie Floyd

Personnel
 Bruce Springsteen – lead vocals, guitars, harmonica
 Roy Bittan – piano, background vocals
 Clarence Clemons – saxophone, percussion, background vocals
 Danny Federici – organ, electronic glockenspiel, background vocals
 Garry Tallent – bass guitar
 Steven Van Zandt – guitars, background vocals
 Max Weinberg – drums

References

2015 live albums
Bruce Springsteen Archives